Jean Nayrou (1914–1983) was a French politician who was Senator of Ariège from 1955 to 1980.

References

Page on the Senate website

1914 births
1983 deaths
Socialist Party (France) politicians
French Senators of the Fourth Republic
French Senators of the Fifth Republic
Senators of Ariège (department)